Multiball may refer to:
 Multiball system, a method in association football where an assistant supplies another football when the original ball has gone out of play
 A situation in pinball where several balls are in play at the same time
 A training method in table tennis where balls are continuously fed to the player, either by another player or a ball robot
 A challenging variation of table football, where the game is played with two balls. A multiball occurs when one team scores both balls. If both teams have a score of 9, the winner can be decided by the next multiball.